Attorney General May may refer to:

Clark W. May (1869–1908), Attorney General of West Virginia
Dwight May (1822–1880), Attorney General of Michigan
George Augustus Chichester May (1815–1892), Attorney-General for Ireland